Sashko Dikov (born 25 July 1952) is a Bulgarian alpine skier. He competed in the men's slalom at the 1976 Winter Olympics.

References

1955 births
Living people
Bulgarian male alpine skiers
Olympic alpine skiers of Bulgaria
Alpine skiers at the 1976 Winter Olympics
Place of birth missing (living people)